Udesh is a Sinhalese masculine given name. Notable people with the name include:

Udesh Perera (born 1985), Sri Lankan cricketer
Udesh Shrestha (born 1981), Nepali pop singer, music composer, and songwriter

Sinhalese masculine given names